Byredo is a Swedish company producing fragrances, leather goods, and accessories made in Sweden. Byredo is a portmanteau of  "By Redolence". It was founded in Stockholm in 2006 by Ben Gorham.

It deals with leather products, perfumes, and the first collection of handbags and small leather goods debuted at Paris Fashion Week in September 2017.

History
In 2013, Gorham sold a majority stake of the company to London-based investment firm Manzanita Capital, which has invested in Diptyque and Malin + Goetz, and owns Space NK.

In May 2022, Puig acquired a majority stake in Byredo.

Collaborations
Perfumer Jérôme Epinette has created scents for the brand. Byredo collaborated with photographers Inez and Vinoodh on its 1996 Inez & Vinoodh fragrance.

In 2018, Byredo collaborated with Off-White's Virgil Abloh on a new fragrance "Elevator Music."

Byredo collaborated with IKEA on a home fragrance expected to launch in 2019. This materialized as the OSYNLIG candle collection, released November 1, 2020. It also launched the fragrance Space Rage in partnership with the singer Travis Scott.

References

Cosmetics companies of Sweden
Luxury brands
Perfume houses
Swedish brands
2006 establishments in Sweden
Companies based in Stockholm
Niche perfumes